Adelpha iphiclus, the Iphiclus sister, is a butterfly of the family Nymphalidae. It was described by Carl Linnaeus in his 1758 10th edition of Systema Naturae. It is found in the tropics and sub-tropics of Central and South America, from Mexico to Bolivia. The habitat consists of disturbed areas in deciduous and evergreen forests at altitudes ranging from 0 to 1,200 meters.

The wingspan is about 47 mm. Adult males engage in mud-puddling. Adults of both sexes feed at over-ripe fruits of mango, Guazuma and Genipa, but have also been observed feeding on the nectar of Vochysia and Paullinia flowers.

The larvae feed on Calycophyllum candidissimum, Isertia and Uncaria species. Young larvae feed on the leaf tips. It constructs a chain of frass along the midrib. Full-grown larvae are dark brown.

Subspecies
Adelpha iphiclus iphiclus (Mexico to western Colombia, Venezuela, Ecuador, Peru, Bolivia, Surinam, Brazil: Amazon, Mato Grosso)
Adelpha iphiclus ephesa (Ménétriés, 1857) (Brazil: Santa Catarina, São Paulo to north-eastern Argentina)
Adelpha iphiclus estrecha Willmott & Hall, 1999 (western Ecuador)

References

Butterflies described in 1758
Adelpha
Fauna of Brazil
Nymphalidae of South America
Taxa named by Carl Linnaeus